One Damned Day at Dawn… Django Meets Sartana! ("That Cursed Winter Day: Django and Sartana to the Death") is a 1970 Spaghetti Western directed by Demofilo Fidani.

Plot
Django, a gunfighter, teams up with another gunfighter named Sartana to wipe out a gang of gun-runners that have been terrorizing the citizens of Black City.

Releases 
One Damned Day at Dawn… Django Meets Sartana! was released in 1970. The film is not an official part of the Sartana series and along with Pasquale Squitieri's Django Defies Sartana, was among two of the unofficial Sartana films released in 1970.

Reception
In a retrospective review, Howard Hughes wrote in his book Cinema Italiana that One Damned Day at Dawn...Django Meets Sartana! was "a plotless meander made on the cheap in familiar Lazio quarries." and stated that "Fidani's westerns, particularly [this film], are notable for their stunt performer's twitching deaths, which more closely resemble electrocution or gymnastics" and finally compared the director to Ed Wood, stating that Fidani's film titles were always more imaginative than the bargain-basement films they publicise.

References

Sources

External links 
 

Spaghetti Western films
Django films
1970 Western (genre) films
1970 films
1970s Italian films